Amber Zoe Savva (born 1993) is a British actress. She is perhaps best known for her role as Serena in the 2007 film Fishtales.

Filmography
 The Bill (2005, 1 episode) Sanura Azmi
 Fishtales (2007) as Serena Bradley

External links 

British actresses
1993 births
Living people